St George's Church, Morebath is a Grade II* listed parish church in the Church of England Diocese of Exeter in Morebath, Devon. It is part of the Hukeley Mission group of parishes, which also includes St Michael & All Angels Bampton, St Peter's in Clayhanger, St Petrock's in Petton and All Saint's in Huntsham.

History

The church dates from the 13th century but much is from the 15th century.

The church was restored by William Butterfield between 1874 and 1875.

The role of the parish church in Morebath in the 16th century is described in Eamon Duffy's book The Voices of Morebath. Further insight into life in the village and church are provided by the handwritten records of the Revd. Christopher Trychay (Vicar from 1520 to 1574).

Organ
The organ is by William Hill and Son and dates from 1874. A specification of the organ can be found on the National Pipe Organ Register.

References

Church of England church buildings in Devon
Grade II* listed churches in Devon
William Butterfield buildings